My Best Friend's Wife is a 1998 Italian comedy film written and directed by Vincenzo Salemme, adapted from his play.

It marked the directorial film debut of Salemme, and enjoyed a considerable commercial success.

Plot 
Roberto Cordova is a  middle-aged Neapolitan doctor who has to go to America for a major surgery. He is afraid he will die, so asks his friend Michele to let him sleep with his beautiful Swedish wife, Frida, as his last wish. Michele loves Frida, but agrees, and so does Frida. 

Roberto's operation succeeds and he survives, but seven  months later he discovers that Frida is pregnant.

Cast 
Vincenzo Salemme as Roberto Cordova
Carlo Buccirosso as Michele Seta
Maurizio Casagrande as Father Leonardo
Eva Herzigová as Frida
Nando Paone as Geremia  
Biagio Izzo as Gioacchino

References

External links

1998 films
Italian comedy films
1998 comedy films
1998 directorial debut films
Films directed by Vincenzo Salemme
1990s Italian films